Marlow By-pass Bridge is a road bridge across the River Thames in England. It  carries the A404 road between Maidenhead, Berkshire and High Wycombe, Buckinghamshire.  and crosses the Thames on the reach between Cookham Lock and Marlow Lock.

The bridge forms part of the  Marlow by-pass to the east of the town. It was built in 1972.

The area underneath the bridge is used for boat storage by the adjacent outdoor adventure centre at Longridge (a registered charity).

See also
Crossings of the River Thames

References

Bridges across the River Thames
Bridges in Berkshire
Bridges in Buckinghamshire
Bridges completed in 1972
Bisham
Road bridges in England